Aivar Anniste (born 18 February 1980) is an Estonian footballer, who plays  for Viimsi JK. He plays the position of central midfielder.

Club career
He played for FC Flora Tallinn for several seasons, then went to Norway to Hønefoss BK and then he played in Sweden for Enköpings SK for half season, before moving back to Estonia.

International career
He was an Estonia national football team player, having participated in 45 matches and scoring 3 goals with the senior side.

Career statistics

International goals

References

External links

1980 births
Living people
People from Põltsamaa
Estonian footballers
Association football midfielders
Estonia international footballers
FC Valga players
FC Flora players
Viljandi JK Tulevik players
Ullensaker/Kisa IL players
Tartu JK Tammeka players
Hønefoss BK players
Enköpings SK players
FC TVMK players
Estonian expatriate footballers
Estonian expatriate sportspeople in Norway
Expatriate footballers in Sweden
Estonian expatriate sportspeople in Sweden
JK Tervis Pärnu players